The Queen Is Dead is the third studio album by English rock band the Smiths. Released on 16 June 1986 in the United Kingdom by Rough Trade Records, and on 23 June 1986 in the US by Sire Records, it spent 22 weeks on the UK Albums Chart, peaking at number two. It also peaked at number 70 on the US Billboard Top Pop Albums chart, and was certified Gold by the RIAA in late 1990. 

The album was produced by frontman Morrissey and guitarist Johnny Marr, working predominantly with engineer Stephen Street, who had engineered the band's previous album Meat Is Murder (1985). Marr wrote the music for several songs that appeared on The Queen Is Dead while the Smiths toured Britain in early 1985, working out arrangements with bassist Andy Rourke and drummer Mike Joyce during soundchecks. The title of the album is from Hubert Selby Jr.'s 1964 novel Last Exit to Brooklyn. The cover art features French actor Alain Delon in the 1964 film L'Insoumis.

In 2020, Rolling Stone ranked The Queen Is Dead 113th on its updated list of 500 Greatest Albums of All Time. In its 2013 list, NME named The Queen Is Dead the greatest album of all time.

Songwriting
Marr was heavily influenced by the Stooges, the Velvet Underground, and the Detroit garage rock scene while crafting the album. 

The album’s title track was based on a song Marr began writing as a teenager. "The Boy with the Thorn in His Side" was, according to Marr, "an effortless piece of music", and was written on tour in the spring of 1985. The song's lyrics refer allegorically to the band's experience of the music industry that failed to appreciate it. In 2003, Morrissey named it his favourite Smiths song.

A demo of the music for "Some Girls Are Bigger Than Others" was posted by Marr through Morrissey's letterbox in the summer of 1985. Morrissey then completed the song by adding lyrics. Marr has stated that he "preferred the music to the lyrics".

"Frankly, Mr. Shankly", "I Know It's Over" and "There Is a Light That Never Goes Out" were written by Morrissey and Marr in a "marathon" writing session in the late summer of 1985 at Marr's home in Bowdon, Greater Manchester. The first of these is reputed to have been addressed to Geoff Travis, head of the Smiths' record label Rough Trade, however Morrissey denies this. Travis has since described it as "a funny lyric" about "Morrissey's desire to be somewhere else", acknowledging that a line in the song about "bloody awful poetry" was a reference to a poem he had written for Morrissey.

"There Is a Light That Never Goes Out" features lyrics drawn from "Lonely Planet Boy" by the New York Dolls. According to Marr: "When we first played it, I thought it was the best song I'd ever heard". The song's guitar part drew on the Rolling Stones' cover of Marvin Gaye's "Hitch Hike", whose original version by Gaye himself had acted as an inspiration for the Velvet Underground's "There She Goes Again".

The music for "Never Had No One Ever", completed in August 1985, was based on a demo which Marr had recorded in December 1984, itself based on "I Need Somebody" by the Stooges. According to Marr: "The atmosphere of that track pretty much sums up the whole album and what it was like recording it." The lyric to the song reflects Morrissey's feeling unsafe and, being from an immigrant family, not at home on the streets of Manchester.

"The Boy with the Thorn in His Side", "Bigmouth Strikes Again" and "Frankly, Mr. Shankly" were debuted live during a tour of Scotland in September and October, during which "The Queen Is Dead" and "There Is a Light That Never Goes Out" were sound-checked.

The song "Vicar in a Tutu" was considered "throwaway" by Marr, who stated "It made a change from trying to change the fucking world." "Cemetry Gates" was a late addition to the album. Marr had not believed that the guitar part was interesting enough to be developed into a song, but Morrissey disagreed when he heard Marr play it. The "All those people .... I want to cry" section is largely taken from the film The Man Who Came To Dinner, which also inspired one of Morrissey's aliases, Sheridan Whitehead. The words the song's narrator has heard "said a hundred times (maybe less, maybe more)" are based on lines from Shakespeare's Richard III. The song evokes Morrissey's memories of visiting Southern Cemetery in Manchester with artist Linder Sterling.

Recording
The album was produced by Morrissey and Marr, working predominantly with engineer Stephen Street, who had engineered the band's 1985 album Meat Is Murder. Street recalled: "Morrissey, Johnny and I had a really good working relationship – we were all roughly the same age and into the same kind of things, so everyone felt quite relaxed in the studio".

At the time the group was having difficulty with its record label Rough Trade. However, according to Street, "this didn't get in the way of recording because the atmosphere in the studio was very, very constructive."

The first song from the album to be recorded, in July 1985, was "The Boy with the Thorn in His Side". The recording, made with engineer Stephen Street at a small studio in Manchester and initially intended as a demo, was considered by the band to be good enough for release as a single. It went on sale on 16 September 1985 and made number 23 in the UK Singles Chart.

In August 1985, "Bigmouth Strikes Again" and "Some Girls Are Bigger Than Others" were recorded at RAK Studios in London, along with the B-sides to "The Boy with the Thorn in His Side"; "Asleep" and "Rubber Ring". Kirsty MacColl sang a backing vocal for "Bigmouth Strikes Again" but it was considered "really weird" by Marr, and was replaced with a sped-up vocal by Morrissey in the final mix, for which he is credited as Ann Coates on the sleeve of The Queen Is Dead. "Some Girls Are Bigger Than Others" includes a false fade near the start, intended by Street to give the impression of a door closing and opening again. During the same session, a first version of "Never Had No One Ever" was recorded.

The bulk of the album was recorded in the winter of 1985 at Jacob Studios in Farnham, under the working title "Margaret on the Guillotine".

"Frankly, Mr. Shankly" was an attempt to recreate the "vibe" of Sandie Shaw's "Puppet on a String", although "it didn't quite work out that way", according to Marr. Linda McCartney was asked to play piano on the track, but declined, and a first take featuring a trumpeter was scrapped. The version originally intended for inclusion on The Queen Is Dead was ruined by a technical glitch on the tape, and so the song was re-recorded with John Porter at Wessex Studios in London.

"The Queen Is Dead" was among the last songs to be recorded. Its distinctive tom-tom loop was created by Mike Joyce and Stephen Street using a sampler. A line of guitar feedback was played by Marr through a wah-wah pedal throughout the song.

Composition
The song "There Is a Light That Never Goes Out" was a contender for lead single from the album, but was passed over in favour of "Bigmouth Strikes Again". (Later in 1986 it was released as a 7"-only single in France). The song received a belated release as a single in 1992 when it became one of WEA used it to promote Smiths re-releases and best-of compilations released in the years following the band’s breakup. In 1990 the song was voted no. 1 on a list of the greatest songs of all time by the readers of SPIN magazine in the US.

"Cemetry Gates" was Morrissey's direct response to critics who had cried foul over his use of texts written by some of his favorite authors, notably Shelagh Delaney and Elizabeth Smart. Oscar Wilde, who was also accused of plagiarism, figures as a patron saint of Morrissey's in the song's lyrics. A Wilde quote, "Talent borrows, genius steals", was etched in the vinyl run-out grooves of the single single off the album, "Bigmouth Strikes Again". These etchings appear almost exclusively on the UK releases (denoted by the RT and RTT prefixes on the catalogue number).

"The Queen Is Dead", which leads off the album and notably became an expressionistic music video directed by Derek Jarman, starts with a sampled excerpt from Bryan Forbes' 1962 British film The L-Shaped Room. Another instance of Morrissey's fascination with 1960s British cinema, the film featured performances by Pat Phoenix (who had already appeared as a cover star on the 1985 single "Shakespeare's Sister") and Cicely Courtneidge as an elderly lesbian veteran of the music halls. The soundbite is Courtneidge's character nostalgically singing the First World War song "Take Me Back to Dear Old Blighty". The actress had also appeared in a gala performance for the Silver Jubilee of Elizabeth II, entitled God Save the Queen; she died in 1980.

A few songs, including "The Queen Is Dead" and "Bigmouth Strikes Again", feature pitch-shifted backing vocals by Morrissey. Morrissey liked to experiment with effects on his voice, so Street ran his voice through a harmoniser for the backing tracks. Street recalled, "At that time, apart from the harmoniser, he didn't go for much backing vocal or harmony work – he's done that more on recent albums – but he did like to experiment". The backing vocals are attributed to "Ann Coates" on the record sleeve (Ancoats is a district in Manchester, just north-east of the city centre).

Release

The Queen Is Dead was released in 16 June 1986, and was previewed by the release of "Bigmouth Strikes Again" as a single in 19 May. Many encouraged the band to release "There Is a Light That Never Goes Out" as a single, but Johnny Marr is said to have wanted an explosive, searing single, along the lines of the Rolling Stones' "Jumpin' Jack Flash", to announce that the Smiths had returned from hiatus. It did not fare as well as expected, stalling at number 26 on the British charts. However, the album became an international success upon release, staying in the European Albums Chart for twenty one weeks, peaking at number 19 in that chart based on the sales from 18 major European countries. It also reached No. 70 on the US Billboard Top Pop Albums chart, and was certified Gold by the RIAA in late 1990.

In June 2017, one year after the album's 30th anniversary, the Smiths released the full version of "The Queen Is Dead" on vinyl with other Smiths songs: “Oscillate Wildly,” “Money Changes Everything,” and “The Draize Train” serving as B-sides. The band also released a 7" single containing "The Queen is Dead" and "I Keep Mine Hidden." Later that month, Morrissey accused HMV of trying to "freeze sales" on the new re-issues after the store limited the number of records sold to one per person. Later in 2017, the album was re-released on Warner Bros. Records including new studio takes of "There's a Light That Never Goes Out" and "Rubber Ring" as well as a previously unheard live album recorded in 1986. In a press release for the re-issue Morrissey said of the album "You progress only when you wonder if an abnormally scientific genius would approve – and this is the leap The Smiths took with The Queen Is Dead."

Critical reception

From contemporary reviews, Mark Coleman of Rolling Stone remarked on Morrissey's sense of humour and singled out the singer's performance on "Cemetry Gates" as a highlight, concluding that "like it or not, this guy's going to be around for a while." Writing in pop magazine Smash Hits, Tom Hibbert gave a favourable review, stating that "the guitars are great, some of the words are marvellous, others like scratchings on a Fifth Form desk", as well as describing Morrissey as "half genius half buffoon". Robert Christgau of The Village Voice wrote that despite his dislike of the Smiths' previous albums, he held an "instant attraction" to The Queen Is Dead, where he found that "Morrissey wears his wit on his sleeve, dishing the queen like Johnny Rotten never did and kissing off a day-job boss who's no Mr. Sellack", which "makes it easier to go along on his moonier escapades". J. D. Considine found that the group "epitomize all that is admirable and annoying about British new music" finding the groups material "is terrifically tuneful" due to Marr's "incisive, visceral guitar work", but that Morrissey "had a tendency to wander away from conventional notions of pitch often mangling the band's melodies in the process". Considine concluded that Morrissey was "mostly in control of his voice" praising "Cemetery Gates", "Bigmouth Strikes Again" and declaring that "There Is a Light That Never Goes Out" as "the most affecting performance".

Pitchfork listed The Queen Is Dead as the sixth-best album of the 1980s. In 2000 it was voted number 10 in Colin Larkin's All Time Top 1000 Albums. In 2003, The Queen Is Dead was ranked number 216 on Rolling Stones list of The 500 Greatest Albums of All Time, and 218 in a 2012 revised list. In 2006, it was named the second-greatest British album of all time by the NME. In 2006, Q magazine placed the album at number three in its list of "40 Best Albums of the '80s". UK-based magazine Clash added The Queen Is Dead to its "Classic Album Hall of Fame" in its June 2011 issue, saying it "is an album to lose yourself in; it has depth, focus and some great tunes. It's easy to see why the album is held in such high esteem by Smiths fanatics and why, a decade later, it became a key influence for all things Britpop." In 2012, Slant Magazine listed the album at number 16 on its list of "Best Albums of the 1980s" and said: "There may never again be an indie-rock album as good as The Queen Is Dead". In 2013, The Queen Is Dead was ranked the greatest record of all time on the NMEs Greatest Albums of All Time list. At Rolling Stone, Gavin Edwards retrospectively viewed the album as "one of the funniest rock albums ever", noting that Morrissey had "learned to express his self-loathing through mockery" while Johnny Marr "matched his verbal excess with witty, supple music", and concluded, "If the queen's reaction to Morrissey was 'We are not amused,' then she was the only one."

Track listing

2017 collector's edition
Disc one features the 2017 master of the album. Disc four DVD features the 2017 master in 96 kHz / 24-bit PCM stereo.

Personnel

The Smiths
 Morrissey – lead vocals, backing vocals 
 Johnny Marr – guitars, orchestration , string synthesizer, harmonium, marimba 
 Andy Rourke – bass guitar
 Mike Joyce – drums

Production
 Morrissey – production
 Johnny Marr – production
 Stephen Street – engineering 
 John Porter – engineering 

Design
 Steve Wright – group photography
 Morrissey – sleeve
 Caryn Gough – layout

Charts

Certifications

References

Bibliography

External links
 

The Smiths albums
1986 albums
Rough Trade Records albums
Sire Records albums